The 2018 FIBA Under-18 Women's Americas Championship is an international basketball competition that currently takes place from August 1–7, 2018 in Mexico City, Mexico. This is the twelfth edition of the championship, and is the FIBA Americas qualifying tournament for the 2019 FIBA Under-19 Women's Basketball World Cup in Thailand. Eight national teams from across the Americas, composed of women aged 19 and under, will compete in the tournament.

Participating teams
 North America:
 
 
 Central America: 2017 Centrobasket U17 Women's Championship in Aguada, Puerto Rico - 15–19 August 2017
  (hosts)
 
 
 South America: 2017 South American U17 Women’s Championship in Sucre, Bolivia - 28 June–2 July 2017

Preliminary round
The draw was held in Mexico City, Mexico on 10 July 2018.

All times are local (UTC-5).

Group A

Group B

Knockout stage

Bracket

Quarterfinals

5–8th place semifinals

Semifinals

Seventh place game

Fifth place game

Third place game

Final

Final ranking

References

External links
Official website

FIBA Americas Under-18 Championship for Women
2018 in women's basketball
2018–19 in North American basketball
2018–19 in South American basketball
August 2018 sports events in Mexico
2018 in Mexican sports
International women's basketball competitions hosted by Mexico
2018 in Mexican women's sports